John Sexton was President of New York University.

John Sexton may also refer to:

John Sexton (photographer) (born 1953), American photographer
John Sexton (MP for Canterbury), Member of Parliament (MP) for Canterbury, 1393-1407
John Sexton (MP for Cambridge), MP for Cambridge, 1416
John Henry Sexton (1863–1954), Baptist minister in South Australia
John W. Sexton (born 1958), Irish poet
John Sexton & Co, grocer
John Sexton (rugby union), b. 1963, Irish rugby player
Johnny Sexton, b. 1985, Irish rugby player
Jack Sexton (1900–1935), Australian rules footballer

See also
 John Saxton (disambiguation)